Leeza SOHO, also known as Li Ze Tower, is a skyscraper located in the Lize Financial Business District in Beijing, China. SOHO China acquired land use rights in 2013 for ¥1.922 billion RMB (US$288 million). The construction of the building began in 2015 and it was opened on 19 November 2019, making it the third of three buildings designed by Zaha Hadid Architects and developed by SOHO China, along with Galaxy SOHO and Wangjing SOHO.

Notable features

Atrium 

The atrium twists 45° over the height of the building to allow natural light to all floors. Structural rings at each level, four sky bridges, and a double-insulated glass façade unite the two halves of the tower together.

Subway connection 
Leeza SOHO is located at the intersection of Line 14 and Line 16 of the Beijing Subway network. Lize Shangwuqu station is served by Line 14, and will be served by Line 16 and Daxing Airport Express in the future.

See also 
 Galaxy SOHO
 Wangjing SOHO
 Zaha Hadid Architects

References

External links 
 Gallery #1 - archdaily.com
 Gallery #2 - archdaily.com
 Zaha Hadid Architects Page for Leeza SOHO

Skyscrapers in Beijing
Commercial buildings completed in 2019
2019 establishments in China
Buildings and structures in Fengtai District